Harry Churchill Boyes (12 March 1868 – 26 October 1892) was a South African international rugby union winger.

Biography
Boyes was educated at Diocesan College and St. Andrew's College, Grahamstown before playing provincial rugby for Griqualand West. He made two appearances for South Africa, both during Great Britain's 1891 tour. Boyes was selected to play in the 1st match of the series, which was South Africa's first as a Test nation, Great Britain won the game 4–0. He also played in the second Test, another Great Britain victory, but was not included in the side for the final match. Boyes died the following year, in Kimberley, at the age of 24 when he fell off the switchback railway at the Kimberley Exhibition.

Test history

See also
List of South Africa national rugby union players – Springbok no. 4

References

 
 

South African rugby union players
South Africa international rugby union players
1868 births
1892 deaths
Alumni of Diocesan College, Cape Town
Rugby union wings
Alumni of St. Andrew's College, Grahamstown
Rugby union players from Cape Town
Griquas (rugby union) players